Corilla gudei is a species of air-breathing land snail, a terrestrial pulmonate gastropod mollusk in the family Corillidae.

The specific name gudei is in honour of malacologist Gerard Pierre Laurent Kalshoven Gude.

Distribution
Distribution of Corilla gudei includes Sri Lanka.

References

External links

Corillidae
Gastropods described in 1897